The San Francisco Film Critics Circle Award for Best Screenplay is given by the San Francisco Film Critics Circle (only in 2004 and 2005).

Winners

2000s

San Francisco Film Critics Circle Awards